Sofyan Tan (peh-oe-ji: Tan Kim Yang) is a Chinese Indonesian doctor and politician from Medan. He was elected as 
member of the People's Representative Council in 2019 from the North Sumatran first electoral district.

He was born and raised in Medan, attending Sutomo School and later studying Medicine at the Universitas Methodist Indonesia.

Work
Long being an educational advocate, he founded a private school Yayasan Perguruan Sultan Iskandar Muda aiming to help underprivileged students in 1987. 
In 1992 he was awarded the Ashoka Fellowship for his educational work.

Family
He is married to Elinar and has 4 children.

References

Members of the People's Representative Council, 2019
1959 births
Indonesian people of Chinese descent
Indonesian Hokkien people
Living people
People from Medan